A T-cell vaccine is a vaccine designed to induce protective T-cells.

T-cell vaccines are designed to induce cellular immunity. They are also referred to as cell-mediated immune (CMI) vaccines.

It is thought that they can be more effective than conventional B-cell vaccines for protection from microbes that hide inside host cells, and viruses (such as HIV or influenza) that mutate rapidly.

T-cell vaccines underwent clinical trials for HIV/AIDS.

 none have been approved.

As December 2020, The Pfizer-BioNTech Covid jab passed the FDA's emergency use authorization  and became the first FDA authorized T cell vaccine.

References

Vaccines